Bheeshmar is a 2003 Indian Tamil-language crime film directed by actor Ranjith, making his directorial debut. The film stars Ranjith and Devayani, with Rami Reddy, Riyaz Khan, Anu Mohan, Ilavarasu, Vasu Vikram, Sadiq and Baby Prahasitha playing supporting roles. The film, produced by Ranjith's wife Priya Raman, had music by S. P. Venkatesh and was released on 27 September 2003.

Plot
Bheeshmar (Ranjith) is an honest and upright police officer. He is married to Gowri (Devayani), and they have a six-year-old girl named Pappathi (Baby Prahasitha). Bheeshmar is transferred to a new department which is filled with corrupt police officers. Soon, Bheeshmar clashes with policemen Aadhi (Ilavarasu) and Dhandapani (Vasu Vikram), Assistant Commissioner Singampuli (Sadiq), and the heartless politician R. K. (Rami Reddy). Later, Bheeshmar has been suspended for beating up Singampuli in court. Afterwards, the police arrested Bheeshmar for a crime he did not commit, and he is put in jail. Gowri sells her kidney for the advocate's expenses to release him. After that, Bheeshmar ends up fighting with rowdies while bringing the medicine for his wife. He is not able to make it at the right time, so his wife dies in the hospital. The unemployed Bheeshmar turns berserk and kills all of his enemies. He is again arrested and is brought by a police van. In the traffic signal, he sees his daughter begging for food. She tries to run towards his van, and meanwhile, an accident happens to her. Bheeshmar wakes up screaming with his daughter nearby; he realizes that it was a nightmare. At that point, he understands that the evil in the society is way more powerful than him. He then burns his police uniform and decides to start a new life with Pappathi.

Cast

Soundtrack

The film score and the soundtrack were composed by S. P. Venkatesh. The soundtrack, released in 2003, features 1 tracks with lyrics written by Snehan.

Reception

Critical response
Malathi Rangarajan of The Hindu said "In the area of dialogue, he (Ranjith) scores. As a hero he fills the bill. It is in the other departments that he is found wanting". Sify wrote : " Ranjith has perpetuated so many stereotypes in this flick [...] The fatal flaw in the film is the screenplay, which is screeching and at times tries to be a third rate tearjerker" and said : "the censors have butchered the film and in most of the scenes dialogue cuts make the film jarring". Reviewer Balaji Balasubramaniam said "It is a credible first effort and credit goes to Ranjith for not resorting to unnecessary elements like romance or a comedy track to try to make the movie more entertaining. But ultimately, the movie turns out to be too predictable and violent to make an impression" and stated : "Ranjith the actor scores the most points when compared to the other responsibilities he has taken on". Entertainment portal Bizhat.com gave the film a negative review : "The honest police - goondas story in nothing new to Tamil audience. Having chosen this subject Ranjith could have taken more care in the narration. The screenplay lacks consistency".

Box office
The film became a flop in the box office. Following the failure of the film, Ranjith was not able to produce his next own film because of the lack of fund. Ranjith then ventured to do a couple of character roles in Malayalam and Tamil films.

References

2003 films
2000s Tamil-language films
Fictional portrayals of the Tamil Nadu Police
Fictional Indian police officers
Indian police films
2003 directorial debut films